Julie Anne Robinson is a British theatre, television, film director and producer based in the United States and United Kingdom. She is known for her work on The Catch, which she developed and executive produced with Shonda Rhimes, as well as Bridgerton, Masters of Sex, Nurse Jackie, Orange is the New Black, Grace and Frankie, Castle Rock, Parks and Recreation, The Good Place and Selfie. She has directed two features, One for the Money (2012) and The Last Song (2010). She has directed twelve network television pilots in the United States, seven of which have gone to series. Robinson has been nominated for two BAFTAs and a Golden Globe for her work as a director. Robinson founded CannyLads Productions in the United States, as well as co-founding Longboat Pictures in the United Kingdom with former ITV commissioner and producer Victoria Fea.

Filmography

Television series 

 Doctor Who (2024-)
 Partner Track (2022-)
 Bridgerton (2020)
 On Becoming a God in Central Florida (2019)
 I Feel Bad (2018)
 Castle Rock (2018)
 A.P. Bio (2018)
 The Good Place (2018)
 I'm Dying Up Here (2017)
 The Last Tycoon (2017)
 Masters of Sex (2016)
 Roadies (2016)
 The Catch (2016)
 Manhattan (2014—2015)
 Orange Is the New Black (2015)
 Grace and Frankie (2015)
 Nurse Jackie (2015)
 Scandal (2013—2014)
 Selfie (2014)
 Suburgatory (2012—2014)
 Brooklyn Nine-Nine (2013—2014)
 The Middle (2009—2014)
 Parks and Recreation (2013)
 How to Live with Your Parents (For the Rest of Your Life) (2013)
 Weeds (2007—2012)
 2 Broke Girls (2012)
 Pan Am (2011)
 Scoundrels (2010)
 Pushing Daisies (2009)
 Big Love (2009)
 Grey's Anatomy (2006—2009)
 Emily's Reasons Why Not (2008)
 Samantha Who? (2008)
 Private Practice (2007)
 Goldplated (2006)
 Girls on the Bus (2006)
 Holby City (2001—2005)
 Blackpool (2004)
 No Angels (2004)
 Cutting It (2002)
 Doctors (2000—2001)

Feature films 
 One for the Money (2012)
 The Last Song (2010)

Awards and nominations

References

Citations

External links

CannyLads Productions website
Longboat Pictures website

British expatriates in the United States
British television directors
British theatre directors
English-language film directors
British film directors
British women film directors
British women television directors
Living people
Place of birth missing (living people)
Year of birth missing (living people)